Chen Jinchu (born 3 August 1957) is a Chinese fencer. He competed in the individual and team sabre events at the 1984 Summer Olympics.

References

External links
 

1957 births
Living people
People from Guangdong
Sportspeople from Guangdong
People from Zhongshan
Chinese male sabre fencers
Olympic fencers of China
Fencers at the 1984 Summer Olympics
Asian Games medalists in fencing
Fencers at the 1978 Asian Games
Fencers at the 1986 Asian Games
Asian Games gold medalists for China
Asian Games silver medalists for China
Medalists at the 1978 Asian Games
Medalists at the 1986 Asian Games
20th-century Chinese people
21st-century Chinese people